This Long Eaton railway station was built in 1847 for the Midland Railway.

History
Situated on Nottingham Road, it opened in 1847 on the Erewash Valley Line. The  station built by the Midland Counties Railway known as Long Eaton and opened in 1839 was renamed Long Eaton Junction.

It closed for passengers on 1 June 1863 when a new Long Eaton station opened on Station Road, but appears to have remained open for goods traffic for a few years afterwards.

Stationmasters
John Chappell ca. 1851
Alfred William Button ca. 1857
Michael Pullan ca. 1861 - 1863 (afterwards station master at the new Long Eaton station)
William H. Newton 1863 - 1864 (afterwards station master at the new Long Eaton station)
Michael Pullan 1864 (transferred to Goods Dept)
H. Milner 1864 - ca. 1867

See also
Long Eaton railway station (Midland Counties Railway)
Long Eaton railway station

References

Disused railway stations in Derbyshire
Station
Railway stations in Great Britain opened in 1847
Former Midland Railway stations
Railway stations in Great Britain closed in 1863
1847 establishments in England
1863 disestablishments in England